Individually and Collectively is the seventh album of original material by American pop group The 5th Dimension, released in 1972. The album peaked at No. 58 on the Billboard Top 200 Albums chart on June 24, 1972. This album includes both of the group's final top 10 hits on the Billboard Hot 100 Singles chart — "(Last Night) I Didn't Get to Sleep at All" and "If I Could Reach You". Both feature lead vocals by Marilyn McCoo.

The album's title is reflective of the record containing content in which the group goes from its famous five-part harmonies to lead-feature songs.  Billy Davis, Jr. is the lead on nearly half of the album, including on the group's cover of Elton John's Border Song.  Ron Townson is also issued a rare lead vocal on Band of Gold.  Black Patch, a Laura Nyro composition which ends the album, features each member taking lead on part of a verse, including – for the first time – Lamonte McLemore.  The group would perform this final song on Soul Train, along with the 1973 non-album single, Flashback.

Track listing
"Leave a Little Room" (Lead Vocals: Billy Davis, Jr.)
"(Last Night) I Didn't Get to Sleep at All" (Lead Vocals: Marilyn McCoo)
"All Kinds of People" (Lead Vocals: Florence Larue)
"Sky & Sea"
"Tomorrow Belongs to the Children" (Lead Vocals: Billy Davis, Jr.) 
"Turn Around to Me"
"If I Could Reach You" (Lead Vocals: Marilyn McCoo)
"Half Moon" (Lead Vocals: Billy Davis, Jr.)
"Band of Gold" (Lead Vocals: Ron Townson)
"Border Song" (Lead Vocals: Billy Davis, Jr.)
"Black Patch"

Charts

Personnel
Marilyn McCoo – vocals
Florence LaRue – vocals
Billy Davis, Jr. – vocals
Lamonte McLemore – vocals
Ron Townson – vocals

References

The 5th Dimension albums
1972 albums
Bell Records albums